Single Collection is Jun Shibata's first compilation album. It was released on September 21, 2005, and peaked at No. 23 in Japan.

Track listing
Boku no mikata (ぼくの味方; My Friend)
Sore demo kita michi (それでも来た道; It Nevertheless Is the Road I Came From)
Gekkouyoku (月光浴; Moonlight Bath)
Kataomoi (片想い; One-Sided Love)
Tonari no heya (隣りの部屋; The Room Next Door)
Tameiki (ため息; Sigh)
Anata to no hibi (あなたとの日々; The Days With You)
Miseinen (未成年; Underage)
Chiisana boku e (ちいさなぼくへ; To the Small Me)
Shiroi Sekai (白い世界; White World)
Maboroshi (幻; Illusion)

Charts

External links
http://www.shibatajun.com— Shibata Jun Official Website 

2005 compilation albums
Jun Shibata albums